"Selfish Love" is a song by English singer-songwriter Jessie Ware. It was written by Ware, Ross Golan, Ryan Tedder, Ammar Malik,
Benny Blanco, Cashmere Cat and Happy Perez, with production handled by the latter three. The song was released via Island Records on 31 August 2017, as the second single from the singer-songwriter's third studio album, Glasshouse (2017).

Background
The song premiered on Zane Lowe's Beats 1 radio show. Ware told Lowe on the show that the song was written during "a frustrating songwriting session" with Benny Blanco in December 2016, and she was starting to worry that she "couldn't write another song now that [she] was a mom and [she] was tired." Blanco later played a voice note on his phone of an idea he and Ryan Tedder "messed about with last week", it featured Tedder singing the chorus on the acoustic guitar. "I was like, 'This is incredible. Please, can we work with this?' It feels [like] Sade, it feels like we can make it a bit D'Angelo," she said. Ware said of the song in a press release: "'Selfish Love' is a track that reminds me why I enjoy singing so much. Even though it's coming at the end of the summer, I hope you play it in the heat." In an interview with London Evening Standard, Ware said: "We took the reverb away, which was quite scary until I realised that people quite liked it. There wasn't so much focus on the production, which was how it was led before. There are still electronics, to make it feel modern, but I really tried to home in on becoming a better songwriter. The songs came first."

Critical reception
Noisey Staff of Vice called the song "a more sultry affair, ditching the tension or soulful stomp of 'Midnight' in favor of an smoldering slow samba". They regarded it as a reworking of Moloko's 1998 single "Sing It Back", and wrote that "the lyrics are all Lana Del Rey-esque". Owen Myers of The Fader thinks the song "would make a steamy soundtrack to a heated summer romance in the Basque". Derrick Rossignol of Uproxx felt the song "slows things down for a smoother, sexier, and bass-carried vibe with a distinct Latin flair". Tom Breihan of Stereogum called it "a coldly flirty song about an emotionally distant dude, with a bit of a bossa nova lilt".

Music video
The video was directed by Tom Beard and set in Majorca, and is a prequel to the visual for "Midnight". It was described as the first of a two-part story, with the "Midnight" video being the second. Ware played the role of one half of a couple in a strained relationship with the dishonest man, who has been cheating on her, as they spend time in a luxurious property.

Track listing

Credits and personnel 
Credits adapted from Tidal.

 Jessie Ware – songwriting, vocals
 Ross Golan – songwriting, additional vocals
 Benny Blanco – songwriting, production, keyboard, programming
 Cashmere Cat – songwriting, production, keyboard, programming
 Happy Perez – songwriting, production, keyboard, guitar, programming
 Ryan Tedder – songwriting
 Ammar Malik – songwriting, additional vocals
 Induce – mastering engineering
 David Schwerkolt – engineering
 Pino Palladino – bass guitar
 Morgan Stratton – assistant recording engineering
 Chris Dave – drums
 David Okumu – guitar
 Spike Stent – mixing

Charts

Release history

References

2017 songs
2017 singles
Jessie Ware songs
Island Records singles
Songs written by Jessie Ware
Songs written by Ross Golan
Songs written by Ryan Tedder
Songs written by Ammar Malik
Songs written by Benny Blanco
Songs written by Cashmere Cat
Song recordings produced by Benny Blanco
Song recordings produced by Cashmere Cat
Songs written by Happy Perez